Robert Steele (26 February 1893 – 29 September 1969) was a British sailor. He competed at the 1936 Summer Olympics and the 1952 Summer Olympics.

References

External links
 

1893 births
1969 deaths
British male sailors (sport)
Olympic sailors of Great Britain
Sailors at the 1936 Summer Olympics – 8 Metre
Sailors at the 1952 Summer Olympics – 6 Metre
Place of birth missing